Rundfunkhaus was a radio station based in Berlin.  It was used for broadcasting Nazi propaganda by the Ministry of Propaganda.

Broadcasters included: -

Edward Vieth Sittler

See also
 Büro Concordia

References

Radio stations in Germany
Mass media in Berlin
Collaborators with Nazi Germany
Radio in Nazi Germany